Wolf Pen or Wolfpen may refer to:
Wolf Pen, Arkansas in Carroll County, Arkansas
Wolfpen (Mallie, Kentucky), listed on the National Register of Historic Places in Knott County, Kentucky
Wolf Pen, West Virginia in Wyoming County
Wolfpen Creek (Kansas), a stream in Kansas
Wolfpen Creek (Indian Creek tributary), a stream in Missouri
Wolfpen Ridge, a ridge in Georgia